Hazarikhil Wildlife Sanctuary  is a Wildlife sanctuary at the Ramgarh- Sitakunda forests , 45 km north of the Chittagong port in south-East of Bangladesh. The IUCN protected area category is II.

Description
The terrain is irregular with many ridges protruding into spurs running irregularly. The climatic conditions are typically sub-tropical with a dry spell from November to May. The sanctuary receives heavy rainfall in June–September. The soil is loam, clay loam or sandy loam at different places. The IUCN protected area category is IIC.

History
There are 925 families living inside the sanctuary mostly from the tribal ethnic groups.

Biodiversity
The sanctuary has a Tropical evergreen and semi-evergreen type of forest ; the sanctuary is covered with dense shrubby vegetation with patches of dense forest and Bamboos.

Flora
The forest type is mainly tropical evergreen and semi evergreen. The predominant tree species include Dipterocarpus spp., Artocarpus chaplasha, Tetrameles nudiflora, Cedrela toona, Mesua ferrea, Eugenia spp., Ficus spp. and Albizzia procera. The undergrowth in the forest is mainly bamboo species and Eupatorium odorum. There are 478 species of plants identified in the sanctuary. They include 189 tree species, 119 shrubs, 26 climbers, 170 herbs and 2 epiphytes. Some of the rare species rediscovered are Aglaia edulis (Roxb.) Wall., Knema erratica (Hook.f. and Thom.) J. Sinclair and Artabotrys caudatus Wall ex Hook.f. and Thom.

Fauna
The commonly found wild animals are Rhesus macaque (Macaca mulatta), Capped langur (Presbytis pileata), Dhole (Cuon alpinus), Wild boar (Sus scrofa), Sloth bear (Melursus ursinus), Hoolock gibbon (Hylobates hoolock). Leopard (Panthera pardus), Indian muntjac (Muntiacus muntjak) and Sambar (Cervus unicolor). The reptiles include Indian rock python. The globally near threatened species of Himalayan serow (Capricornis thar) is found in the sanctuary. There are 150 species of birds identified in the sanctuary.

See also

 List of protected areas of Bangladesh

References

National parks of Bangladesh
Forests of Bangladesh
Lower Gangetic Plains moist deciduous forests